Robert Aldridge may also refer to:
Robert Aldridge (priest) (died 1616), English clergyman
Robert Aldridge (MP), Irish politician, MP for Carysfort 1799–1800
Robert Aldridge (composer) (born 1954), American composer